José Manuel Aira Lindoso (born 14 March 1976) is a Spanish former footballer who played as a central defender, currently manager of Deportivo Alavés B.

Having made two La Liga appearances for Deportivo de La Coruña, he spent most of his playing career in the Segunda División, playing 182 games for five teams, mainly Racing de Ferrol and Poli Ejido.

Aira's managerial career was mainly spent at the lower levels, apart from seven games with Albacete after winning promotion from Segunda División B in 2017, and brief spells with Rudeš of Croatia and Sochaux in France the following year.

Playing career
Born in Ponferrada, Castile and León, Aira arrived at Deportivo de La Coruña from local SD Ponferradina aged 19, but never broke into the first-team setup during his spell, only appearing twice in La Liga. With more individual success, he spent the next seven seasons in the Segunda División, with CD Tenerife, Racing de Ferrol (twice), Sporting de Gijón and Polideportivo Ejido.

Aira returned to Galicia in the summer of 2006, moving to CD Lugo which had just returned to Segunda División B after a three-year absence. He continued to be a defensive mainstay until returning to Ferrol, now in the Tercera División.

Coaching career
Aira retired in 2011, being immediately named manager of his last club Racing. He was subsequently in charge of Real Murcia and Albacete Balompié, leading the latter in their promotion to the second tier in 2017. He was dismissed on 2 October that year, with the team second from bottom.

On 13 March 2018, Aira moved abroad for the first time to NK Rudeš of Croatia, who had also had compatriot Iñaki Alonso in charge at the start of the season. His time there was brief, as by 23 May he was in charge of FC Sochaux-Montbéliard of France's Ligue 2. Having won one of nine games with the side in 18th on 25 November, he was sacked.

Aira took over at Cultural y Deportiva Leonesa on 18 December 2018 until the end of the third-division campaign, with an extra year in the case of promotion. They eventually missed the playoffs and his contract expired, though a deal on the same terms was agreed the following 20 June.

On 3 August 2020, Aira signed a one-year deal to manage Marbella FC also in division three. He was relieved of his duties the following 23 March, having failed in his goal of bringing the team to promotion, instead landing them in the new Segunda División RFEF.

Aira was hired by UCAM Murcia CF on 21 March 2022, replacing Salva Ballesta at a side facing relegation from the Primera División RFEF. Having won once in the remaining 11 fixtures, his services were not retained and he moved on to Deportivo Alavés B in June.

Personal life
Aira's younger brother Carlos was also a footballer and manager. Having also played for Deportivo B, he spent most of his career at amateur level.

Managerial statistics

Honours

Manager
Racing Ferrol
Tercera División: 2012–13

References

External links

1976 births
Living people
People from Ponferrada
Sportspeople from the Province of León
Spanish footballers
Footballers from Castile and León
Association football defenders
La Liga players
Segunda División players
Segunda División B players
Tercera División players
Deportivo Fabril players
Deportivo de La Coruña players
CD Tenerife players
Racing de Ferrol footballers
Sporting de Gijón players
Polideportivo Ejido footballers
CD Lugo players
Spanish football managers
Segunda División managers
Segunda División B managers
Tercera División managers
Primera Federación managers
Segunda Federación managers
Racing de Ferrol managers
Real Murcia managers
Albacete Balompié managers
Cultural Leonesa managers
Marbella FC managers
UCAM Murcia CF managers
Deportivo Alavés B managers
Croatian Football League managers
NK Rudeš managers
Ligue 2 managers
FC Sochaux-Montbéliard managers
Spanish expatriate football managers
Expatriate football managers in Croatia
Expatriate football managers in France
Spanish expatriate sportspeople in Croatia
Spanish expatriate sportspeople in France